Olive-brown oriole has been split into the following species:
 Timor oriole, Oriolus melanotis
 Wetar oriole, Oriolus finschi

Birds by common name